Barbora Štefková was the defending champion, but chose not to participate.

Başak Eraydın won the title, defeating Petra Krejsová in the final, 6–3, 6–0.

Seeds

Draw

Finals

Top half

Bottom half

References
Main Draw

Lale Cup - Singles
Lale Cup
Lale Cup
Lale Cup